The seventh season of the reality television series Love & Hip Hop: Atlanta premiered on VH1 on March 19, 2018 until July 16, 2018. The show was primarily filmed in Atlanta, Georgia. It is executively produced by Mona Scott-Young and Stephanie R. Gayle for Monami Entertainment, Toby Barraud, Stefan Springman, David DiGangi, Lashan Browning and Donna Edge-Rachell for Eastern TV, and Nina L. Diaz, Liz Fine and Vivian Gomez for VH1.

The series chronicles the lives of several women and men in the Atlanta area, involved in hip hop music. It consists of 18 episodes, including a two-part reunion special hosted by Nina Parker.

Production
Season seven of Love & Hip Hop: Atlanta began filming during the last week of October 2017. A few days prior, singer Jhonni Blaze, who appeared on Love & Hip Hop: New York and the cancelled Love & Hip Hop: Houston, exposed several of the upcoming season's storylines in a series of Instagram videos, including Rasheeda and Kirk's allegedly fabricated secret baby storyline and Stevie J's alleged sexual tryst with transgender model Shauna Brooks. Blaze was set to join the cast as Stevie's new artist, serving as a replacement for Joseline Hernandez, however she fell out with show's producers after her Love & Hip Hop: Houston co-star and rival Just Brittany was cast. On December 11, 2017, filming was interrupted in Buckhead after a mall security guard was allegedly run down by a disgruntled customer. The show made headlines again a few weeks later, after it was alleged that cast member Tommie Lee brought a loaded gun to set, in a heated confrontation with Karen King. In February 2018, Tommie ran into legal issues during filming after allegedly attacking a jewelry store employee.

On February 16, 2018, VH1 announced Love & Hip Hop: Atlanta would be returning for a seventh season on March 19, 2018, with Love & Hip Hop: New Yorks Erica Mena as part of the cast. The same day they released a scene from the premiere episode, showing Erica's arrival to Atlanta. This season featured an entirely new opening credits sequence. Season seven saw the promotion of Jessica Dime to the main cast after appearing as a supporting cast member for three seasons. New cast members include Jessica's fiancé Shawne Williams, Grammy Award winning songwriter Sean Garrett, Jamaican recording artist Spice, singer and Signed star Just Brittany, rappers Tokyo Vanity and BK Brasco and music executive Keely the Boss. Although not included in the initial cast announcement, rapper Tabius Tate and party promoter K. Botchey would also appear in supporting roles. After a two year absence from the show, Erica Dixon would return as a supporting cast member for two episodes. Love & Hip Hop: New York star Rich Dollaz would make a special crossover appearance in the last two episodes of the season.

On February 20, 2018, VH1 released a teaser with the season's tagline "the game has changed", featuring Mena alongside returning cast members Rasheeda, Stevie J, Karlie Redd and Mimi Faust. The season's promotional videos would all follow a card game or poker-themed aesthetic, with cast members dressed as playing cards. On March 12, 2018, a five-minute super-trailer was released, followed by "meet the cast" interview promos featuring new cast members Erica Mena, Tokyo Vanity, Spice, Keely the Boss, BK Brasco, and Estelita Quintero. On March 13, 2018, VH1 released the first five minutes of the season's premiere episode.

In the eleventh episode, "Houston We Have A Problem", one scene shows an intoxicated Tommie Lee breaking the fourth wall and attacking a producer, as well as security. In an unusual move, executive producer Stephanie Gayle announced to the cast on camera that Tommie was no longer allowed on set, effectively firing her from the show.
However, she returned to the show two episodes later, on the condition that she not drink on set. During filming, Jessica Dime publicly criticised Mona Scott-Young for passing on a proposed wedding special starring her and Shawne. Subsequently, she was phased out of the show and did not attend the season's reunion.

Reception
The season garnered the lowest ratings in the show's history, with its premiere episode down over a million viewers compared to last season.

Cast

Starring

 Rasheeda (17 episodes)
 Mimi Faust (16 episodes)
 Karlie Redd (18 episodes)
 Jessica Dime (7 episodes)
 Tommie Lee (11 episodes)
 Erica Mena (14 episodes)
 Stevie J (9 episodes)

Also starring

 Kirk Frost (15 episodes)
 Yung Joc (16 episodes)
 Estelita Quintero (15 episodes)
 Spice (13 episodes)
 Jasmine Washington (10 episodes)
 Shirleen Harvell (5 episodes)
 Sierra Gates (16 episodes)
 BK Brasco (14 episodes)
 Tokyo Vanity (15 episodes)
 Melissa Scott (7 episodes)
 Shooter Gates (9 episodes)
 Tabius Tate (10 episodes)
 Samantha Lee (5 episodes)
 Keely Hill (11 episodes)
 Just Brittany (10 episodes)
 Tiarra Becca (10 episodes)
 Savannah Jordan (2 episodes)
 Kelsie Frost (8 episodes)
 Karen King (4 episodes)
 Momma Dee (10 episodes)
 Shawne Williams (5 episodes)
 K. Botchey (8 episodes)
 Lil Scrappy (3 episodes)
 Sean Garrett (13 episodes)
 Bambi Benson (3 episodes)
 Erica Dixon (2 episodes)
 Rich Dollaz (2 episodes)

Tammy Rivera returns in a guest role for two episodes. Ty Young, Tommie's sister Versace, Sas and Bleu DaVinci would appear as guest stars in several episodes. The show features minor appearances from notable figures within the hip hop industry and Atlanta's social scene, including Jazze Pha, Tommie's brothers Duby & Yanira, Erica's friend Albee Yours, Rasheeda and Kirk's son Ky Frost, Stevie's children Sade and Dorian Jordan, Married to Medicines Dr. Jackie Walters, Michael Blackson, Cocoa Brown, Sam Phillips, Amber Priddy, Ernest Bryant, Dawn Heflin and Flavor of Loves Deelishis.

Episodes

Webisodes

Check Yourself
Love & Hip Hop Atlanta: Check Yourself, which features the cast's reactions to each episode, was released weekly with every episode on digital platforms.

Music
Several cast members had their music featured on the show and released singles to coincide with the airing of the episodes.

References

External links

2018 American television seasons
Love & Hip Hop